Hăsnășenii Noi is a commune in Drochia District, Moldova. It is composed of two villages, Hăsnăşenii Noi and Lazo (formerly Cuza-Vodă). At the 2004 census, the commune had 1,736 inhabitants.

References

Communes of Drochia District